The 2016 Canberra Challenger was a professional tennis tournament played on outdoor hard courts. It was the first edition of the tournament, which was part of the 2016 ATP Challenger Tour. It took place in Canberra, Australia between 9 and 16 January 2016.

The tournament attracted 10 of the world's top 100 singles players, and although the 2016 edition was described as a "one-off" due to a gap in the events with the draw sizes changing in Sydney and Auckland, Tennis ACT boss Ross Triffitt campaigned for it to become a permanent fixture in the tennis calendar, succeeding in getting the event a spot in the 2017 ATP Challenger Tour schedule.

Singles main draw entrants

Seeds

Other entrants
The following players received wildcards into the singles main draw:
 Daniel Hobart
 Alex De Minaur
 Alexei Popyrin
 Max Purcell

The following players received entry from the qualifying draw:
 Sergey Betov
 Frank Moser
 Daniel Nolan
 Steven de Waard

Champions

Men's singles

 Paolo Lorenzi def.  Ivan Dodig 6–2, 6–4

Men's doubles

 Mariusz Fyrstenberg /  Santiago González def.  Maverick Banes /  Jarryd Chaplin 7–6(7–3), 6–3

References

External links
 
 ATP Challenger Tour official site

2016 ATP Challenger Tour
2016 in Australian tennis
Can